Maxillaria uncata, the hook-shaped maxillaria, is a species of orchid ranging from southern Mexico to southern Brazil.

References

External links 

uncata
Orchids of Brazil
Orchids of Mexico